Wolfgang Brinkmann (born 23 May 1950) is a retired German equestrian. He won a gold medal in show jumping with the West German team at the 1988 Summer Olympics and finished in 19th place individually.

Personal life
Brinkmann was born in Bielefeld, North Rhine-Westphalia, on 23 May 1950.

References

1950 births
Living people
German male equestrians
Olympic equestrians of West Germany
Olympic gold medalists for West Germany
Equestrians at the 1988 Summer Olympics
Olympic medalists in equestrian
Medalists at the 1988 Summer Olympics
Sportspeople from Bielefeld